Bellona – St. Petersburg is a branch of the environmental rights organization the Bellona Foundation, headquartered in Oslo, Norway. Founded in 1986, the Bellona Foundation primarily functions as a nuclear watchdog and focuses on developments in Russia.

The St. Petersburg office of Environmental Rights Center Bellona (ERC Bellona) was founded in April 1998 following the trials of such activists as Fedorov – Mirzoyanov, Nikolai Shchur, and Alexander Nikitin, who had begun to distribute information about environmental threats and were being persecuted by the very agencies responsible for causing these threats. These cases highlighted the need to provide legal support for an organization to defend the rights of all Russians to unspoiled natural resources and reliable information about their condition.

Goals of the organization

ERC Bellona's aims are centered around the belief that the rights to unspoiled natural resources and reliable environmental information are fundamental, and its mission is to protect these rights.

ERC Bellona's goals include:

 Fighting for observance of Russian environmental legislation
 Providing legal and informational support to victims of environmental accidents and abuses of environmental law
 Assisting in the development of Russian environmental legislation to ensure it is in line with international standards
 Enlightening, informing, and educating citizens on environmental issues
 Creating conditions in Russia for the establishment of a strong environmental and human rights movement
 Enabling participation of citizens and NGOs in the decision-making process surrounding environmental issues

Projects

ERC Bellona's activities take three main directions: a legal, informational, and expert assessment. The Legal direction is concerned with extending legal help to Russian citizens. The Informational direction is intended to increase awareness through its website and quarterly magazine, Ecology and Law. The Expert Assessment direction is geared towards generating independent presentations, expert opinions, and various other informational materials on topics such as: 

 Atomic energy safety.
 Methods for dealing with nuclear waste.
 The development of environmentally sound, renewable energy.
 Issues concerning the transport of oil and gas.

Each year, ERC Bellona carries out more than five different projects, the results of which are published on its website in the form of annual reports. However, Bellona considers its founding and continued operation as an environmental rights organization whose reputation and image allow it to raise issues and solve problems of environmental safety, defense of natural resources and environmental human rights, to be its primary achievement over the last ten years. ERC Bellona has informational, legal and expert resources that allow it to be a crucial partner for NGOs, civil activists, and ordinary citizens whose rights are violated by the government and members of the business community.

Staff and location

The staff of ERC Bellona consists of permanent employees, part-time personnel and volunteers. Staff members are:
 Alexander Nikitin, Council Chairman of ERC Bellona's Director's Board
 Yuri Bdovin, Council Vice-chairman of ERC Bellona's Directors Board
 Yuri Schmidt, attorney, council member of ERC Bellona's Directors Board, president of Lawyers for Human Rights
 Nikolay Rybakov, executive director of ERC Bellona
 Lyubov Ermakova, Director of Financial Administration
 Natalya Shibko, Bookkeeper
 Elena Kobets, Director of Development
 Aleksei Nasonov, Fundraising Specialist
 Natalya Yevdokimova, Head of the Legal Division
 Nina Popravko, attorney
 Nadezhda Mukhina, attorney
 Anastassia Timoshenko, public relations
 Vladimir F. Levchenko, Moderator of the international environmental network ENWL
 Yuri Chernogorov, nuclear projects expert
 Michael Amosov, expert
 Lina Zernova, Editor of the journal Environment and Rights
 Alexander Gorbanovsky, Managing Editor of the journal Environment and Rights
 Alexandra Solokhina, layout for the journal Environment and Rights

ERC Bellona is located in the center of St. Petersburg, on Suvorovsky Prospect.

External links
 ERC Bellona – St. Petersburg
 Bellona Foundation – website in English, Norwegian and Russian
 Ecology and Law – quarterly magazine (in Russian)
 "Ecologists: 10,000 Tons Of Waste Headed for City". The St. Petersburg Times
 YouTube video Bellona activists measure radioactivity, protest near barrels of uranium waste, in St Petersburg.

References 

Environmental organizations based in Russia
Foundations based in Norway
Anti–nuclear power movement
1998 establishments in Russia